Asphyx is a Dutch death metal band formed by Bob Bagchus and Tony Brookhuis in Overijssel, Netherlands, in 1987.

History 
The band was formed in 1987 by Bob Bagchus and Tony Brookhuis. Joost was picked up for vocals and bass, but was replaced by Chuck Colli after the release of the first demo Carnage Remains. This line-up released the Enter the Domain demo after, which Eric Daniels was found as a second guitarist. In March 1989, Colli was replaced by Theo Loomans and the band recorded the Crush the Cenotaph demo. Brookhuis then left the band and the remaining three recorded Embrace the Death, an album which was never released because of label problems.

After leaving Pestilence in the early 1990s, Martin van Drunen joined Asphyx and the band signed to Century Media Records. After the release of their first album, The Rack, they went on a European tour with Entombed, followed by a tour with Bolt Thrower and Benediction in 1992. Shortly after the recording of the second album, Last One on Earth, van Drunen left the band, to be replaced by Ron van der Pol. Eventually Bagchus left the band as well and was replaced by Sander van Hoof.

In 1994, the band released its third, self-titled album, but broke up shortly afterward. In 1995, Loomans and Bagchus reformed Asphyx and recorded God Cries. Around the same time, the Embrace the Death album, recorded in 1990, was released. Nevertheless, the band split up again after the release. In 1998, Loomans died when a train hit his car. The circumstances suggest it was an act of suicide. Some time later, Soulburn was founded by Bagchus and Daniels and, together with Pentacle singer and bass guitarist Wannes Gubbels, they recorded Feeding on Angels. In 1999, they renamed the project Asphyx and recorded the On the Wings of Inferno album with the same line up. However, Asphyx disbanded again in 2000.

In January 2007, the band re-united with van Drunen, Gubbels, Paul Baayens and Bagchus. They did not intend to record a new album, but focused only on live performances. However, in January 2008, they recorded a cover of a Celtic Frost song and a new song called "Death...The Brutal Way". In July 2008, they announced that new material was being prepared. Death...The Brutal Way was released in June 2009 by Century Media. It was released in North America by Ibex Moon Records on 18 August 2009, quickly becoming the distributor's best seller.

On 30 November 2011 Asphyx finished recording on their eighth studio album entitled Deathhammer which was set to be released on 27 February 2012 in Europe and 28 February 2012 in North America via Century Media Records.

In March 2014, founding member Bob Bagchus parted ways from the band and leaving the band with no original members. He was replaced by Stefan Hüskens as the new drummer.

On 14 October 2015, Asphyx made an announcement they are working on a new album at the end of November for the long-awaited Deathhammer follow up and begin their first tour at Latin America.

Members

Current members 
Martin van Drunen – vocals (1990–1992, 2007–present), bass (1990–1992)
Paul Baayens – guitar (2007–present)
Alwin Zuur – bass (2010–present)
Stefan Hüskens – drums (2014–present)

Former members 
Tony Brookhuis – guitar (1987–1989)
Bob Bagchus – drums (1987–1993, 1995–1996, 1997–2000, 2007–2014)
Eric Daniels – guitar (1989–1995, 1996, 1997–2000)
Joost – vocals, bass (1987–1988)
Chuck Colli – vocals, bass (1988–1989)
Theo Loomans – vocals, bass, guitar (1989–1990, 1995–1996; died 1998)
Ron van Pol – vocals, bass (1992–1994)
Heiko Hanke – keyboards (1994)
Sander van Hoof – drums (1993–1994)
Heiko Hanke – keyboards (1994)
Ronny van der Wey – guitar (1988–1989, 1995)
Wannes Gubbels – bass, vocals (1997–2000, 2007–2010)

Timeline

Discography

Studio albums 
 The Rack (1991)
 Last One on Earth (1992)
 Asphyx (1994)
 God Cries (1996)
 Embrace the Death (1996; recorded in 1990)
 On the Wings of Inferno (2000)
 Death...The Brutal Way (2009)
 Deathhammer (2012)
 Incoming Death (2016)
 Necroceros (2021)

Live albums 
 Live Death Doom (2010 double live album and DVD)

Extended plays (EPs) 
 Crush the Cenotaph (1992)
 Servants of Death (2016)

Singles 
 Mutilating Process (1989)
 Death the Brutal Way (2008)
 Reign of the Brute (2012)
 Deathibel (2016)

Demos 
 Carnage Remains (1988)
 Enter the Domain (1989)
 Crush the Cenotaph (1989)
 Promo '91 (1991)
 Promo '95 (1995)

References

External links 

 Asphyx bio on angelfire

Dutch death metal musical groups
Dutch doom metal musical groups
Dutch heavy metal musical groups
Musical groups established in 1987
Musical groups disestablished in 1994
Musical groups reestablished in 1995
Musical groups disestablished in 2000
Musical groups reestablished in 2007
Musical quartets